KWXC (88.9 FM) is a radio station broadcasting a religious format. Licensed to Grove, Oklahoma, United States, the station is currently owned by Grove Broadcasting Inc.

References

External links
 

WXC
Delaware County, Oklahoma